Rubislaw and Queens Terrace Gardens are two small public gardens in Aberdeen, Scotland. Although they are officially two parks, they are bisected only by one road which runs between the 1 hectare rectangular area it covers, so can be considered as one park for this article.

It is located between the streets of Rubislaw Terrace and Albyn Place, in the west-end of Aberdeen approximately 300 metres from the main street in Aberdeen, Union Street.

There is a fountain in the park made from pink granite and trees which are over a century old. On the Rubislaw Terrace (north) side of the park, there is a gray granite wall of small pillars along the entire side.

The park is commonly used by students of the many nearby schools.

See also

Green spaces and walkways in Aberdeen

External links 
Rubislaw and Queens Terrace Gardens

Parks in Aberdeen